I Used to Be Famous is a 2022 British musical comedy-drama film made by Forty Foot Pictures for Netflix. Directed by Eddie Sternberg in his feature length debut, and starring Ed Skrein, Eleanor Matsuura and Leo Long. The film debuted on Netflix on 16 September 2022.

Synopsis
Set in London, former boy band pop star jama on the street with an autistic teenager drummer and starts an unusual friendship.

Cast
 Ed Skrein as Vince
 Leo Long as Stevie 
 Eleanor Matsuura as Amber 
 Kurt Egyiawan as Dia
 Eoin Macken as Austin
 Lorraine Ashbourne as Cheryl
 Neil Stuke as Dennis

Production
Sternberg co-wrote the screenplay with Zak Klein, adapting from Sternberg's short film of the same name. Sternberg based the character of Stevie on his cousin, who is autistic and a drummer.  The film is produced by Collie McCarthy at Forty Foot Pictures for Netflix.

Long, who plays Stevie who has autism, is neuro-divergent himself and diagnosed with a speech and language condition. Long said he is determined to make the industry more 'people-friendly' for disabled musicians & actors. He performed with the London Youth Folk Ensemble and National Open Youth Orchestra prior to his work on the film. The National Autistic Society provided advice and guidance throughout the production.

Release
The film debuted on Netflix on 16 September 2022 and went into the top two on the Netflix chart in the United Kingdom.

Reception
On the review aggregator website Rotten Tomatoes, I Used to Be Famous holds an approval rating of 80% based on 10 reviews.

Glen Kenny in The New York Times praises Skrein for "mostly winning ingenuousness" of his performance, and especially the "seamlessness with which [Long] and his compelling character fit into picture…is the most noteworthy thing about it". He says the film strays into cliché but that makes the "ending which actually takes an exit ramp off triumphalist clichés, genuinely surprising." Lesley Felperin in The Guardian described it as "schematic but sweet-natured".

References

External links

2022 films
British teen comedy-drama films
English-language Netflix original films
2020s English-language films
Films about autism
Films about music and musicians
Films about percussion and percussionists